This is a list of the top-selling albums in New Zealand for 2015 from the Official New Zealand Music Chart's end-of-year chart, compiled by Recorded Music NZ. The chart includes 12 albums by New Zealand artists, including two albums by popera trio Sol3 Mio. The chart also includes 12 albums that featured in the New Zealand top 50 albums of 2014.

Chart 

Key
 – Album of New Zealand origin

Top 20 albums of 2015 by New Zealand artists

References

External links 
 The Official NZ Music Chart - albums

2015 in New Zealand music
2015 record charts
Albums 2015